Paul Nicholas Weekes (born 8 July 1969) is an English former cricketer. He is a left-handed batsman and a right-arm offspin bowler.

Born in Hackney, Weekes made his first-class debut for Middlesex in 1990. He is the only English cricketer to have scored more than 150 runs in both innings of a first-class game. He has twice made over 1,000 runs in 1996 and 2004. He helped Middlesex finish the 2005 National League as runners-up to Essex.

He retired from first-class cricket following Middlesex's relegation at the end of the 2006 county season, having stated his desire to play regular first team cricket earlier in the season. He finished his career with a first-class batting average of 34.88 and a first-class bowling average of 41.97, with 304 wickets to his name.

He plays club cricket for Hornsey Cricket Club and has been a key part of the Hackney Community College Cricket Academy coaching team since 2002. Weekes also coaches twice a week at Westminster School and at Belmont Mill Hill Preparatory School in the summer term. He also coaches the women's teams at Hampstead Cricket Club.

References

External links
 Paul Weekes at Cricinfo
 Paul Weekes at Cricket Archive

1969 births
Living people
English cricketers
Middlesex cricketers
People from Hackney Central
First-Class Counties Select XI cricketers